The 1992 San Diego Chargers season was the team's 33rd season, their 32nd in San Diego, and 23rd in the National Football League.

San Diego came into the season off the back of a 4–12 record in 1991, four consecutive losing records, and nine consecutive seasons without making the playoffs. Bobby Ross began his first season as the team's head coach, after having spent the previous five years as a college coach at Georgia Tech. After starting quarterback John Friesz was injured in preseason, the Chargers lost their first four regular season games while being outscored 95–29, but rallied behind replacement quarterback Stan Humphries and a strong defense. They finished 11–5, clinching the AFC West title and becoming the first (and to this day, only) NFL team to start 0–4 and still make the playoffs.

During the regular season, the Chargers lost all four of their games against eventual playoff teams, though they did defeat Kansas City 17–0 at Jack Murphy Stadium in the Wild Card round. In the Divisional Playoffs, they were emphatically beaten by the Miami Dolphins, being eliminated by a 31–0 scoreline.

Offseason

Head coaching change 
Dan Henning, the Chargers' head coach for the past three seasons, was fired by general manager Bobby Beathard on December 23, 1991, the day after the Chargers completed a 4–12 campaign. Henning had gone 16–32 during his tenure; his entire staff of assistants were also dismissed.

On December 22, Beathard had denied rumours that Georgia Tech head coach Bobby Ross was already set to be installed as Henning's replacement. Nonetheless, Ross remained among the favorites for the role. On December 25, Georgia Tech won the Aloha Bowl by a single point; Ross interviewed for the Chargers job on 30 Dec, and unveiled as head coach on January 2, 1992. Ross' five-year stint in Georgia had seen the Yellow Jackets win a share of the National Championship in 1990. His accomplishments with the Chargers over the next five seasons would earn him a place in their Hall of Fame.

Ross appointed Bill Arnsparger as defensive coordinator after Beathard arranged a meeting. Arnsparger, an NFL coach from 1964 to 1983, had been acting as the University of Florida's athletic director. In the early 70s, he had won two Super Bowls with Miami as a defensive coordinator, running their "No-Name" defense, and faced San Diego in the same role in the Epic in Miami a decade later. Arnsparger installed a 4–3 defense, a switch from the 3–4 alignment preferred by his predecessor Ron Lynn.

Other coaching appointees included numerous assistants Ross brought with him from Georgia Tech. Ralph Friedgen, who had also been with Ross in his previous job at Maryland, was installed as running game coordinator and tight ends coach; the post of offensive coordinator went unfilled until Friedgen was promoted to it two seasons later.

Departures 
For the second consecutive year, the Chargers lost 11 players through Plan B free agency. These included Sam Seale, who had started every game at cornerback in 1991, defensive end George Hinkle, a starter in 13 games, and Kitrick Taylor, who had served as both a receiver and punt returner. Safety Anthony Shelton was injured during training camp, had shoulder surgery and missed the entire season, while H-Back Craig McEwen was waived; neither played in the NFL again.

An well-established name on the defensive line also departed, after failing to come to contract terms with the Chargers. Joe Phillips had been the Chargers' starting nose tackle the previous season, his fifth with the club. He was a holdout through training camp, asking either for more money or to be traded. On 9 September, he narrowly missed a final deadline to accept a two-year deal, and Beathard announced that negotiations were over. Phillips was released on September 21, and signed for the Chiefs.

Arrivals 

On July 27, John Friesz ended a lengthy holdout, signing a two-year deal as the Chargers' starting quarterback. Twelve days later, he suffered a knee injury in the team's preseason opener after a late hit by Ken Harvey. Friesz required surgery for torn knee ligaments and was ruled out for the season, leaving journeyman Bob Gagliano as the only available quarterback with regular season experience.

In April's NFL draft, Beathard had contacted Washington about the potential trade of a 5th-round draft pick for third-string quarterback Stan Humphries, a player he himself had drafted while serving as Washington's general manager in 1988. That trade fell through, but the parties reached an agreement after Friesz's injury, with Humphries moving to San Diego in exchange for what proved to be a 3rd-round pick in the 1993 draft. The new quarterback was already familiar with the Chargers' offensive system, as Dan Henning had been influential in both San Diego (as head coach) and Washington (as offensive coordinator). Humphries, who had fallen out of favor with Joe Gibbs in Washington, described the move as "a new life for me and a new opportunity". He would start 76 regular season games with the Chargers over the next six seasons, leading them to their first Super Bowl appearance and ultimately earning a place in the Chargers Hall of Fame.

Other arrivals included a pair of defensive linemen, Blaise Winter and Shawn Lee. Winter had been with the Chargers for two seasons in the late 1980s, but was unable to find a team in 1991. After winning a spot on the Chargers' roster, he made six sacks and was granted the Ed Block Courage Award by his teammates. Lee was a midseason acquisition from Miami, who saw limited action in 1992, but would start 15 games in each of the next three seasons. Cornerback Sean Vanhorse had been unable to get onto the field in his first two seasons in the league, but started nine games in 1992 after the Chargers picked him up through Plan B free agency.

NFL Draft 

San Diego made Tennessee defensive end Chris Mims their first pick in the draft, with Beathard praising the player's pass rushing ability. Mims produced 10 sacks in his rookie year, and 38 in total during seven seasons with the Chargers.

Other selections made less of an impact in San Diego. 2nd-round pick Marquez Pope would play in the NFL for ten seasons, but only two of those were with the Chargers, for whom he started only a single game. Their next selection, wide receiver Ray Ethridge, caught only two passes in his career. 5th-round offensive linemen Curtis Whitley and Eric Jonassen started two games each. Further down the draft, blocking tight end Deems May started six games in his rookie year, and spent five seasons in San Diego.

Personnel

Staff

Roster

Preseason 

San Diego's preseason began badly, as they were comfortably beaten by Phoenix, and lost starting quarterback John Friesz for the year with an knee injury. The Cardinals scored touchdowns on their first three possessions, and led 28–0 before Derrick Walker caught a touchdown pass from Bob Gagliano. Eric Bieniemy scored the Chargers' second touchdown. Gagliano started at quarterback in the next game, completing 7 of 11 for 123 yards; Marion Butts and Bieniemy scored with short rushes as San Diego beat the Patriots.

Against San Francisco, Gagliano completed 8 of 13 for 87 yards, and ran 20 yards for a touchdown. He then gave way to the newly-signed Stan Humphries, who went 5 of 12 for 52 yards and an interception, while leading a drive that Ronnie Harmon capped with a 9-yard touchdown run. Future Charger Mark Seay scored for San Francisco as they won the game with 17 unanswered 4th quarter points. Gagliano was again the starter in the final preseason game against the Rams, leading an 80-yard touchdown drive on the opening possession, with Rod Bernstine scoring from the 1. Gagliano was 6 of 8 for 90 yards. Humphries took over and completed 11 of 16 for 118 yards, with touchdowns to Harmon and Walter Stanley (the latter of whom was nonetheless cut four days later). John Carney, who had won a training camp battle with Carlos Huerta for the kicking job, converted all three of his field goal attempts.

On August 31, Bobby Ross named Gagliano as his starting quarterback for Week 1 of the regular season. He represented the six different opening day starter for the Chargers in as many seasons.

Regular season

Overview 
Expectations for the Chargers were not particularly high going into the season. A summary of nine major publications found that four of them had San Diego finishing 4th in their 5-team division, while three placed them 3rd and two 2nd. The low expectations seemed justified as the team lost their first four games, but they improved drastically through the next twelve. This was epitomised by the performance of Stan Humphries, who started every game from Week 2 onwards: he threw 1 touchdown and 8 interceptions during the 0–4 start, but 15 touchdowns against 10 interceptions the rest of the way. Overall, Humphries had 3,356 passing yards, the most by a Chargers' starter since Dan Fouts in 1985. Anthony Miller enjoyed a return to form, crossing 1,000 yards receiving for the first time in three seasons. He ranked 10th in the league for receptions, and 6th for receiving yards, catching 72 passes for 1,060 yards and team-leading seven touchdowns. Running back Ronnie Harmon ranked 6th for receptions and 10th for receiving yards, with 79 receptions for 914 yards - he was comfortably the top running back in both categories. Nate Lewis added four touchdowns and over 500 receiving yards.

The Chargers employed a balanced attack that ranked 7th in the league for passing yardage and 9th for rushing (they were 6th overall). Marion Butts led the team with 809 rushing yards. Rod Bernstine had a higher yards per carry than Butts (4.7 to 3.7), but struggled with injuries and only played in nine regular season games. He finished with 499 yards, while Harmon and Eric Bieniemy each contributed over 200. The four running backs combined for 14 rushing touchdowns, and Humphries added four more.

On defense, the Chargers bounced back from a disappointing showing the previous season, improving from 19th to 4th. With the defensive alignment shifting from 3–4 to 4–3, Leslie O'Neal moved from linebacker to defensive end, and saw his sack count increase from 9 to 17, tied for second-best in the league. This also set an official club record (unofficially, Gary "Big Hands" Johnson had  in 1980). With rookie Chris Mims adding 10 sacks (including a safety), and fellow defensive lineman Burt Grossman adding 8 (including two safeties), the Chargers totalled 51, joint third in the league. They were also second in the league for interceptions. Darren Carrington led the team with 6 interceptions, with Donald Frank and Gill Byrd had 4 each. It proved to be the final season of Byrd's playing career; after making only 11 interceptions in the first half of his ten-season career, he totalled 31 interceptions in his final five seasons in the league, 6 more than any other player during that span. All-Pro linebacker Junior Seau led the team with 102 tackles while adding  sacks.

Kicker John Carney was fifth in the league with an 81.3% conversion rate on field goals (he made 26 of 32). This was a return to form after making only 65.5% the previous season. John Kidd was 14th with 42.6 yards per punt.

Schedule 

Note: Intra-division opponents are in bold text.

Game summaries 

All game reports use the Pro Football Researchers' gamebook archive as a source.

Week 1: vs. Kansas City Chiefs 

San Diego gave up two return touchdowns as they began their season with a loss. Ronnie Harmon let the opening kickoff slip through his grasp and out of bounds at the 2, forcing the offense to start from there. After three plays netted only six yards, John Kidd's punt was returned 46 yards for a touchdown by Dale Carter, only 99 seconds into the game. Later in the opening quarter, San Diego were the beneficiaries of a roughing the kicker penalty, extending a drive after they'd been forced to punt. After Anthony Miller caught a 17-yard pass from Bob Gagliano, the drive stalled for a second time and John Carney kicked a 45-yard field goal. Gagliano was sacked on consecutive 2nd quarter plays, again forcing Kidd to punt from deep in his own territory. The Chiefs took possession at the San Diego 48, and gained 8 yards on three plays before Dave Krieg drew Blaise Winter offside with a hard count on 4th and 2. Kansas City added a field goal later on in the drive and led 10–3 at the break.

In the 3rd quarter, Junior Seau stopped one drive with an interception, and another by sacking Krieg at his own 6 yard line. After Kansas City punted, San Diego started their next drive at the Chief 36, and reached a 3rd and 4 at the 13. Gagliano's pass was then tipped away from Harmon by former Charger Martin Bayless, for Kevin Ross to intercept and return 99 yards for a touchdown. Stan Humphries then entered the game; on his second drive, he completed 4 of 5 passes for 36 yards, with a defensive pass interference penalty accounting for a further 27 yards. Rod Bernstine finished the drive with a 2-yard run, drawing San Diego back within seven points with 10:24 still to play. Kansas City responded with a 15-play, 76-yard drive, converting three third downs and running the clock down to 1:23, with Barry Word scoring the clinching touchdown.

The Chargers held Kansas City to 188 yards, but gained a season-low 155 yards. Humphries completed 7 of 10 passes, for 62 yards and an interception. Gagliano was 7 of 20 for 55 yards and two interceptions. He was also sacked 5 times for a combined loss of 50 yards. It was the last start of Gagliano's career, as Humphries was given the starting job in Week 2, and kept it for the rest of the season.

Week 2: at Denver Broncos 

Humphries' first start ended in defeat after a pair of costly interceptions. Denver took the opening kickoff and drove 80 yards in 8 plays, scoring on John Elway's 32-yard touchdown pass to Mark Jackson, with Gill Byrd beaten on the play. An answering 60-yard drive by San Diego came to nothing when Carney's 37-yard field goal attempt was blocked. In the 2nd quarter, San Diego drove 77 yards in 15 plays; Bernstine had 3 carries for 34 yards as the Chargers reached a 3rd and 1 from the Denver 2, but he was then stuffed for a loss of a yard, and Carney came on to kick a short field goal with 1:34 remaining in the first half. Three plays later, Byrd intercepted a deep pass from Elway, and returned the ball 44 yards, from his own 40 to the Denver 16. A touchdown run by Harmon on the next play was wiped out by the first of two successive penalties, but Harmon's one-handed 29-yard reception moved the ball to the 2, from where Nate Lewis caught Humphries' first touchdown pass for the Chargers with 24 seconds on the clock.

Leading 10–7 entering the 3rd quarter, the Chargers allowed a touchdown on Denver's first possession, this time on Elway's 8-yard run. The Chargers pulled back to within a point late in the quarter with a Carney field goal, then forced a three-and-out and took over at their own 19. However, Humphries was intercepted on the next play, and Elway threw a 34-yard touchdown pass to Shannon Sharpe on the play after that. The Chargers crossed midfield on all four of their 4th quarter possessions, but the drives ended with two punts, an interception and the clock expiring.

Bernstine rushed for 83 yards and Marion Butts for 78, as San Diego gained 168 yards on the ground. A third running back, Harmon, led the team in receiving yards with 91 from 7 catches. Humphries threw for 231 yards, but the Chargers again gave up five sacks, this time for a loss of 44 yards.

Week 3: vs. Pittsburgh Steelers 

A 4th quarter collapse saw a close game slip away from the Chargers. They began well, taking the opening kickoff converting three third downs, one of those with Anthony Miller's diving 35-yard reception. Lewis appeared to have opened the scoring with an 11-yard touchdown catch, but Harry Swayne was flagged for illegal motion, and the Chargers settled for a Carney field goal. In the 2nd quarter, the Steelers drove 80 yards in just 4 plays, taking the lead with a Neil O'Donnell touchdown pass. Late in the half, Humphries completed three consecutive passes for 39 yards, but took a blow to the ankle after the third of these and came out of the game.. Gagliano came in and completed his first pass, but the drive stalled and Carney made a 43-yard kick with 1:18 on the clock. Pittsburgh tried to move into field goal range, but Donald Frank intercepted O'Donnell, and the Chargers took over at their own 34 with time for one more play. Gagliano's Hail Mary pass was batted in the air and caught by Harmon for a 55-yard gain, but the Steelers were able to tackle him 11 yards short of the end zone, preserving their 7–6 lead at the intermission.

Gagliano was intercepted on the Chargers' first possession of the second half; Greg Lloyd ran the ball back from his own 45 to the San Diego 20, but Swayne knocked the ball loose at the end of the return and Butts recovered. San Diego punted, and Pittsburgh lost another fumble on the next play, Henry Rolling knocking the ball from Barry Foster's grasp for Byrd to recover. With Humphries back in at quarterback, Bernstine had a 15-yard carry and the Chargers advanced 30 yards to a 4th and 2 at the Pittsburgh 8, before sending Carney in for a go-ahead field goal attempt of 25 yards. Carney pulled his attempt wide to the left, and the game quickly shifted Pittsburgh's way. O'Donnell led an 80-yard drive, capped by his second touchdown pass, though a missed extra point kept the score at 13–6 early in the final quarter. Humphries was intercepted on the next play, and O'Donnell ran for a score five plays later. The Steelers later added a field goal, and Humphries was intercepted a second time as the Chargers tried to pass their way back into the game.

Harmon was again the leading receiver, with 3 catches for 77 yards (he also ran 3 times for 17 yards). San Diego outgained Pittsburgh 330–272 but were hampered by 10 penalties for 90 yards.

Week 4: at Houston Oilers 

San Diego dropped to 0–4 as they were shut out for the first time in four seasons. As they had in their first two games, the Chargers gave up a touchdown on their opponent's first drive, Warren Moon leading an 80-yard drive and finishing it with a 3-yard pass to Haywood Jeffires. The Oilers added a field goal on their next possession. San Diego then converted three third downs in a row, moving from their own 22 to a 3rd and 1 from the Houston 30; Butts and Bernstine were stopped for no gain on back-to-back plays, turning the ball over on downs. On their next drive, they picked up four first downs in moving from their own 2 to a 3rd and 1 at the Houston 39 - this time, Bernstine was stopped for a loss of a yard, and the Chargers elected to punt.

The Chargers were still in the game entering the 3rd quarter, trailing 10–0. However, they punted on their first three possessions of the second half, and Houston responded with two touchdowns and a field goal. San Diego's best chance to avoid the shutout came with five minutes left, after Harmon's 32-yard catch gave them a 1st and goal at the Oiler 4. After two incompletions and a run for no gain, Humphries threw his second interception on the day. A third followed in the final seconds.

Having gone six consecutive quarters without a point and ten without a touchdown, San Diego were already three games behind the division-leading Broncos and Chiefs. This latest one-sided defeat drew negative reviews from the Californian press, with the LA Times giving them a report card with six F grades out of nine, while the North County Times described them as potentially the league's worst team.

Week 5: vs. Seattle Seahawks 

An early touchdown set the Chargers on the way to their first victory under Bobby Ross. On the fifth play of the game, San Diego had a 2nd and 10 at their own 33. Humphries found Miller racing along the left sideline, the receiver catching the ball in stride at the Seattle 40 and outpacing the defense to score with ease. After forcing a punt, the Chargers moved into field goal range with back-to-back receptions of 14 and 19 yards by Miller and Lewis. Humphries then fumbled while being sacked on third down, but Leo Goeas recovered, allowing Carney to extend the lead with a 49-yard kick. The Seahawks responded with a 15-play, 70-yard drive that ended with a John Kasay field goal. The following Charger drive was extended by an illegal contact penalty as Humphries threw incomplete on fourth down, but San Diego came up empty-handed when Carney missed a 34-yarder. Late in the half, Anthony Blaylock intercepted Seattle's backup quarterback Dan McGwire at the Seattle 31 to set up another scoring chance. Four consecutive carries by Bernstine moved the ball to the 7; Humphries was then sacked before twice throwing incomplete, but an illegal use of hands penalty gave the Chargers a fresh set of downs, and Humphries found Miller for a 5-yard touchdown two plays later, making the score 17–3 with 12 seconds remaining in the half.

The Charger offense was less effective in the second half, with their first two possessions both three-and-outs. For the Seahawks, Chris Warren's 52-yard carry set up a field goal late in the 3rd quarter. Carney missed another field goal on the next drive, coming up short on a 51-yarder, but Seattle failed to cross midfield on their final four drives.

Miller finished with 9 catches for 142 yards and two touchdowns, accounting for the majority of Stan Humphries' 200 passing yards. San Diego's defense allowed only 70 net passing yards, while collecting four sacks and three interceptions.

Week 7: at Indianapolis Colts 

Strong play at the start and finish of the game saw the Chargers past Indianapolis. After taking the opening kickoff, they drove 81 yards on 8 plays without facing a third down. Bernstine scored from the 25, hurdling the final potential tackler on his way to the end zone. After the Colts went three-and-out, Humphries immediately aimed a long pass at Lewis, who caught the ball and gained 62 yards before being brought down at the Colt 6. Bernstine ran for 4 and 2 yards on the next two plays, and the Chargers led 14–0 less than nine minutes into the game.

Jeff George led his team 80 yards in response, halving the deficit with a touchdown pass. San Diego responded by driving into Colt territory, but Bernstine fumbled and Quentin Coryatt recovered at his own 28. Following an exchange of punts, Indianapolis drove from their own 20 to a 3rd and goal at the Charger 3, whereupon Darren Carrington intercepted a misplaced George pass in the end zone. San Diego crossed midfield before Humphries, too, was intercepted. The Colts moved into field goal range, but Dean Biasucci was wide left with 14 seconds left in the half.

The turnovers continued in the second half, with Rolling forcing a fumble that Gary Plummer recovered at the Colt 20, setting up Carney's 23-yard field goal. George quickly led his team to a 1st and goal from the 8, but Carrington claimed his second end zone interception. On their next drive, San Diego committed their third turnover in opposition territory, Humphries fumbling when sacked. This time, George capitalized with his second touchdown pass of the game.

San Diego came straight back with an 80-yard, 7-play touchdown drive. Bernstine carried four times for 39 yards, and Eric Bieniemy scored his first career touchdown from the 2, early in the final quarter. Byrd intercepted George early in the next drive, returning it 20 yards for an apparent touchdown. A penalty on Sean Vanhorse wiped out the score, but Leslie O'Neal recovered a fumble two plays later, and Humphries ran in a touchdown two plays later. A further fumble, caused by Mims's sack on George, was recovered by Rolling. That set up a Carney field goal for the game's final points.

Bernstine had 23 carries for 150 yards (this would stand as the best total of his career), with two touchdowns. However, he left late in the game with a shoulder dislocation, and spent the next seven games on injured reserve. San Diego committed three turnovers, the Colts five.

Week 8: vs. Denver Broncos 

A controversial interception helped San Diego close the gap on the division-leading Broncos. After the first ten minutes of the game were scoreless, Bieniemy's 16-yard punt return set the Chargers up at their own 48. Humphries completed passes of 22 yards to Derrick Walker and 38 yards to Miller, the latter for a touchdown. San Diego crossed midfield on their next two possessions, but turned the ball over both times: first, Humphries and Butts misplayed the exchange on an attempted handoff, with Denver recovering the loose ball; later, a Humphries bomb was intercepted at the goal line. After the second of these, Denver drove 80 yards to tie the score on John Elway's 32-yard pass to Mark Jackson. A 30-yard reception by Lewis helped move the Chargers into field goal range, but Carney was wide left as time expired in the half.

On their first possession of the 3rd quarter, the Chargers faced a 3rd and 1 on their own 17. Humphries converted with a 22-yard pass to Miller, immediately followed by a 59-yard connection with Walker, who was eventually brought down on the Denver 2 yard line. On the next play, Humphries dropped the ball in the backfield, but recovered it himself and rushed up the middle for an improvised touchdown. Two plays later, Byrd intercepted Elway and returned the ball 14 yards to the Denver 32. The Chargers were backed up by a penalty, but Humphries found Harmon for 18 yards and followed up with a 27-yard touchdown to Walker, who was unmarked inside the 10. These two scores came only 2:06 apart, and put the Chargers ahead 21–7. Elway attempted passes on 12 out of 15 plays on the next drive, leading his team 80 yards and scoring himself from 5 yards out.

John Kidd pinned Denver inside their own 10 with nine minutes remaining; three plays later, Byrd pulled in a deflected pass for his second interception of the game, his 10-yard return to the Denver 17 setting up a Carney field goal. Elway passed on the next six plays from scrimmage, completing 4 for 65 yards and another touchdown to Jackson. Three plays later, Bieniemy fumbled, giving Denver the ball at the Charger 34, trailing by three with 3:18 to play. On the next play, Anthony Blaylock got ahead of Jackson on a fly route for an end zone interception; the turnover stood despite one of Blaylock's feet clearly coming down out of bounds. Humphries then converted a 3rd and 11 with a 12-yard completion to Harmon, Butts picked up a further first down, and the Chargers ran the clock out.

Humphries had his first 300-yard passing game, completing 20 of 27 for 355 yards, with two touchdowns and an interception. Miller had 6 catches for 129 yards and a touchdown, while Walker had 4 catches for 104 yards and a touchdown, the lone 100-yard receiving game of his career. Gill Byrd's two interceptions gave him nine against Elway in his career.

Week 9: vs. Indianapolis Colts 

A dominant defensive performance evened the Chargers' record at 4–4. San Diego's offense moved the ball freely in the first half, but missed several scoring opportunities. Humphries was intercepted in Colts territory on their first drive, and sacked near midfield to force a punt on the next one. With Indianapolis failing to gain a first down on their first two possessions, the Chargers drove to within a yard of the end zone, only for Butts to fumble as he dove over the goal line, with the Colts recovering. Three plays later, Burt Grossman broke through the line and sacked Jeff George in the end zone for a safety. After the ensuing free kick, a 43-yard catch by Miller set up a 33-yard field goal by Carney. The Colts picked up their first two first downs of the game on the next possession, but back-to-back sacks by O'Neal and Blaise Winter forced another punt. The Chargers led just 5–0 at halftime, despite outgaining the Colts by 203 yards to -5.

The offense managed to score a pair of touchdowns in the 3rd quarter. First, Harmon had a pair of 15-yard receptions on a 76-yard drive; from the Colt 17, Humphries lofted a pass to Lewis in the far left corner of the end zone. Harmon added a 20-yard reception on the next drive, which went 69 yards and ended with Humphries finding Lewis in the same corner for a 9-yard touchdown. The Colts, in the meantime, had gone three-and-out on their first two possessions of the second half. In the final quarter, Stanley Richard intercepted a tipped George pass to set up a 3-yard Butts touchdown with 4:18 to play. Indianapolis then had their best drive of the game moving from their own 1 to the Charger 18 before another Grossman sack forced a fumble that George Thornton recovered, clinching the Chargers' first shutout win since 1986.

Indianapolis mustered only eight first downs (five of these came on their final drive), and 99 total yards (68 on the final drive). Colt quarterbacks were sacked seven times. The 99 yards were the fewest a Charger defense had given up since 1961. The Charger offense, by contrast, picked up 398 yards and 26 first downs, while holding the ball for 42:24. Butts rushed 27 times for 118 yards and a touchdown, while Miller had 6 catches for 105 yards.

Week 10: at Kansas City Chiefs 

A late field goal proved to be the difference, as the Chargers lost a defensive struggle and saw their winning streak stopped at four games. The Chiefs led 3–0 in the opening quarter when Derrick Thomas sacked Humphries, forcing a fumble that Thomas recovered himself on the Charger 15 Christian Okoye scored five plays later. In the 2nd quarter, Thomas stopped another drive with a third down sack. The Chargers forced a punt and moved to the Chief 47, from where a Humphries bomb was brought in by Lewis for an apparent touchdown. However, Broderick Thompson was flagged for holding, negating the score. Thomas then picked up his third and fourth sacks of the half on consecutive plays, forcing another fumble that the Chiefs recovered. Following a Nick Lowery field goal, Kansas City led 13–0 at the break.

The Charger offense improved in the second half. On their second possession, they drove 80 yards in 8 plays for a touchdown. Derrick Walker had 3 catches for 41 yards on the drive, scoring from the 14 yard line. After forcing a punt, San Diego had another long touchdown drive, this time 90 yards in 9 plays. Humphries hit Jefferson in stride up the right sideline for 51 yards to move into Chiefs territory, converted a 3rd and 15 with an 18-yard pass to Miller, then found Harmon for 24 yards on 3rd and 9. Butts scored from a yard out on the next play, putting the Chargers ahead 14–13 early in the final quarter. After the Chiefs twice went three-and-out, either side of a Butts fumble, Harmon took a Humphries pass for 31 yards, and San Diego reached a 3rd and 1 on the Chief 45. With Butts out of the game, Harmon was stopped for no gain and Ross opted to punt. Two further punts followed, before Kansas City took over on their own 33 with 3:18 to play. Dave Krieg completed three consecutive passes, positioning his team for Lowery's game-winning 36-yard field goal with 54 seconds to play. The Chargers began their final drive on their own 20. Harmon got out of bounds for an 11-yard gain on the first play, but Humphries was sacked on the next, before Dale Carter made a game-clinching interception.

Humphries completed 20 of 35 for 294 yards, with a touchdown and an interception. He was sacked six times, and fumbled twice. The Chargers outgained Kansas City 295–211, but committed all four of the game's turnovers. Following this defeat, San Diego were two games behind Denver and one behind Kansas City in the AFC West.

Week 11: at Cleveland Browns 

Anthony Miller's late touchdown proved the winner as San Diego edged Cleveland. Harmon lost a fumble on the game's third play, and the Browns progressed to a 3rd and 4 from the Charger 9. Darren Carrington then intercepted Mike Tomczak and return the ball 69 yards to the Cleveland 26. After two incompletions, Humphries connected with Shawn Jefferson on a corner route for a touchdown. The Chargers threatened again on their next possession, but a third down sack pushed them out of realistic field goal range. Early in the second quarter, Floyd Fields had his only career interception, setting his team up at the Cleveland 49, but an underthrown Humphries pass was intercepted three plays later. Another scoring chance was missed late in the half when Carney's 48-yard field goal attempt was blocked. The Browns drove 51 yards the other way and Matt Stover was successful with a 36-yard kick, reducing San Diego's lead to 7–3 at the interval.

Cleveland and San Diego both punted from near midfield on their first drives of the second half; Carrington downed Kidd's punt at the Cleveland 1. The Browns then drove 99 yards in 10 plays to take the lead on Tomczak's touchdown pass to Michael Jackson. A 20-yard catch by Miller had the Chargers back in field goal range, but Kidd mishandled the snap on what would have been a game-tying 44-yard attempt. Harmon fumbled again on the next Charger drive, leading to another Stover field goal and a 13–7 Cleveland lead with five minutes to play. San Diego began their next drive at their own 28. Butts rushed 4 times for 27 yards before Humphries overthrew Lewis in the end zone, bringing up a 3rd and 8 at the Cleveland 45. Humphries went long again, this time finding Miller in the middle of the end zone with 2:05 to play.

Tomczak responded with three straight completions, but Carrington forced a fumble after the third of these, and Stanley Richard recovered at his own 38 with 52 seconds to play. Butts carried three times, with the Browns calling timeout after each of them, before Kidd punted and Cleveland took over at their own 29 with 29 seconds to play. Tomczak threw an incompletion, then was sacked by Mims. He had time for one more pass, which Jackson caught at the Charger 36 with no time on the clock.

San Diego won despite Tomczak's 322 passing yards, the most any quarterback posted against the Charger defense all season. Miller caught 7 passes for 110 yards and a touchdown.

Week 12: vs. Tampa Bay Buccaneers 

San Diego achieved their first winning record since the end of the 1987 after a game where they led from the 1st quarter onwards. Following an exchange of punts, the Chargers moved from their own 21 to the Tampa 43. Humphries then eluded two potential sacks before taking off up the right sideline for 25 yards. Five plays later, on 3rd and goal from the 3, he found Harmon on a corner route for the touchdown. San Diego scored twice more in the next two minutes. After a penalty backed the Buccaneers up at their own 3, Mims broke through to bring down quarterback Vinny Testaverde for a safety. Lewis field the ensuing free kick near the left sideline at his own 20, angled right to exploit a gap in the Tampa coverage, broke a tackle and made 62 yards before being forced out of bounds on the right sideline. That set up a Carney field goal and a 12–0 lead.

Testaverde led an 80-yard drive in response, featuring an 18-yard run by former Charger Gary Anderson on 3rd and 9 and capped by Testaverde's own touchdown pass. Carney made a 31-yard field goal late in the half, and the Chargers got the ball back at their own 39 with 1:24 left on the clock. Harmon had three catches for 40 yards on the ensuing drive before scoring with a 6-yard run, extending the Charger lead to 22–7 with 14 seconds on the clock.

There was no scoring in the 3rd quarter, but Testaverde ran for a touchdown, again at the end of an 80-yard drive. The Chargers were driving in Buccaneers territory with six minutes to play when Butts lost a fumble. Tampa Bay reached a 4th and 4 at their own 36 and went for the first down but Anderson was stopped a yard short by Carrington and others. Humphries ran in an insurance touchdown in the final minutes, going 4 yards on a naked bootleg.

Mims had three of the Chargers' six sacks. Butts rushed 22 times for 104 yards.

Week 13: vs. Los Angeles Raiders 

Touchdowns on three consecutive first half drive set up an easy prime time win for the Chargers. Los Angeles began the game well, Eric Dickerson rushing on the game's first four plays for a total of 30 yards. They reached the Charger 21, but came up empty handed when a leaping Kevin Murphy blocked Jeff Jaeger's field goal try. The Raiders gained a first down at the Charger 48 on their next drive, but Jay Schroeder's pass was deflected slightly and intercepted inches from the ground by Richard, who returned it 20 yards to the Charger 45. San Diego advanced to the Los Angeles 20 yard line, from where Butts broke through several tackles on a run up the middle, but had the ball knocked loose as he approached the goal line. The loose ball ran generously for Miller to fall on it and recover as he rolled into the end zone.

Los Angeles then put together a 60-yard drive, ending with a successful Jaeger field goal. San Diego's response began at their own 15 yard line. Jefferson converted a 3rd and 10 with a 15-yard catch, and Bieniemy had an 18-yard run up the middle, before Harmon pulled in a one-handed catch and broke to the right sideline for a 45-yard gain, finally being pushed out of bounds a yard from the end zone. Butts scored on the next play. The Raiders drove 62 yards and earned a first down at the Charger 29 late in the half. Tim Brown then caught a short pass but fumbled when tackled by Delton Hall. Seau picked up the loose ball and, following laterals to Vanhorse and Carrington, the Chargers returned it a total of 28 yards to the Raider 48. Ronnie Harmon took a draw 33 yards to the 15, before a pair of controversial plays: Harmon was ruled not to have made a catch in the end zone despite appearing to have both feet down before the ball was knocked away, then an apparent Lewis fumble ruled an incomplete pass. Jefferson caught a touchdown on the next play with 16 seconds left in the half, and the Chargers led 21–3.

San Diego missed chances to extend their lead on their first two possessions of the second half, with Butts stopped short on fourth down, and Humphries intercepted in Raider territory. Los Angeles, however, gained only two first downs in the second half. Dickerson, who had gained 100 yards in the first half, was limited to a single carry for 3 yards as his team played catch-up. Twice in the final quarter, the Raiders went for it on fourth down, but a Winter sack and an incompletion caused them to turn the ball over both times. In each case, the Chargers capitalised with a field goal.

Despite the wide margin of victory, San Diego only outgained the Raiders 333–324. Harmon had 4 carries for 37 yards, and 4 catches for 74 yards.

Week 14: at Phoenix Cardinals 

San Diego moved into a tie atop the AFC West after overcoming an early 14–0 deficit. Harmon fumbled on the opening kickoff, and the Cardinals had to travel only 28 yards for a Chris Chandler touchdown pass. Following a Charger punt, Vanhorse was flagged for a 43-yard pass interference setting up a Johnny Johnson touchdown run only 7:36 into the game. San Diego were forced to punt again, but Carrington intercepted Chandler and returned the ball 37 yards to give them another chance, starting at the opposition 27. After two plays netted four yards, Humphries hit Miller on an out route, and the receiver turned up the left sideline for a touchdown. Phoenix drove 69 yards to the Charger 13 on the next possession, but Shawn Lee forced Johnson to fumble, with Mims recovering. They missed another good scoring chance on their following drive, Greg Davis missing wide left on a 25-yard field goal. Lewis's 17-yard catch on 3rd and 10 helped move San Diego in range for a 50-yard field goal try, which Carney converted late in the final minute of the half; the score was 14–10 at the interval.

Midway through the 3rd quarter, the Cardinals extended their lead - Ricky Proehl got behind Carrington for a 63-yard touchdown reception. The Chargers responded late in the quarter. Humphries had back-to-back completions of 25 yards to Bieniemy and 26 yards to Miller, before Bieniemy scored on a 5-yard run off right tackle. Humphries was intercepted early in the final quarter, but Seau forced a fumble on the next play, with Byrd recovering at the Charger 37. San Diego moved to a 2nd and 20 at the Phoenix 47, from where Humphries hit Lewis with a deep pass to the 1. Butts was stopped for no gain on the next play, then Humphries was nearly intercepted, before Harmon scored and the Chargers had their first lead at 24–20. Phoenix missed another scoring chance on the next drive, Byrd forcing Proehl to fumble at the Charger 32, with Lee making the recovery. On the next Cardinal drive, O'Neal sacked Chandler on 4th and 5, setting up a Carney field goal with 1:44 to play. Frank ended the final Cardinals drive with a fourth down interception.

O'Neal had 4 of the Chargers' 6 sacks. San Diego and Kansas City (who lost to Los Angeles) were tied at 8–5 with Denver a game back, though the Chiefs held the tiebreaker advantage having beaten the Chargers twice.

Week 15: vs. Cincinnati Bengals 

Despite another bad start, the Chargers assured themselves of a winning record and maintained their playoff push. They held the ball for over nine minutes on their opening drive, going 77 yards in 14 plays, with Harmon twice converting third down situations. The running back was eventually stopped at the 3 on 3rd and goal from the 11, and Carney opened the scoring with a short field goal. The Bengals required only one play to respond, David Klingler using play action and finding Jeff Query behind Byrd and Carrington for an 83-yard touchdown. Humphries was intercepted three plays later, though the Charger defense forced a three-and-out. San Diego then began another long drive, going from their own 20 to a 3rd and goal at the Cincinnati 4. On the fifteenth play of the drive, Humphries was intercepted in the end zone. The Bengals drove 50 yards the other way, and added a field goal with 1:41 remaining in the half. Starting from his own 25, Humphries threw passes on seven consecutive plays, completing six of them to four different receivers. He found Miller on a corner route for an 11-yard touchdown with 15 seconds on the clock, and the game was tied 10–10 at halftime.

The Chargers drove 66 yards in 13 plays for another touchdown on their first drive of the second half. Jefferson's juggling 18-yard catch on 3rd and 11 moved the ball into Bengals territory, and Humphries rolled right on a naked bootleg on 4th and goal from the 1, narrowly making it across the goal line for the go-ahead score. Gary Plummer intercepted Klingler on the next play, leaving his offense to drive only 18 yards for their third touchdown in a row: Humphries converted a 4th and 1 with a sneak, and Bernstine, back after an eight-week injury break, went up the middle to score from the 7. After only three more plays, Klinger had a pass batted high in the air by Seau, with Carrington claiming an interception. That set up a 48-yard Carney field goal. An O'Neal sack pushed Cincinnati out of field goal range on their next drive, and San Diego saw out the rest of the game without incident.

The Chargers possessed the ball for nearly 22 minutes in the first half alone, and for over 39 minutes in total. Harmon had 8 catches for 80 yards, and 5 carries for 30 yards.

Week 16: at Los Angeles Raiders 

A dominant first half propelled the Chargers to a playoff berth. After taking the opening kickoff, they drove 59 yards in 12 plays, with Bernstine converting a pair of third downs. Carney capped the drive with a 42-yard field goal, putting San Diego ahead to play. After a Raider three-and-out, the Chargers used up the remainder of the opening quarter, going 51 yards in 13 plays. Humphries converted a 4th and inches with a quarterback sneak, but San Diego eventually settled for another field goal. Los Angeles failed to gain a first down on either of their next two possessions, and the Chargers took control with a pair of Humphries touchdown passes. On 3rd and 6 from the Raider 14, he hit Miller on an out pattern; the receiver eluded a tackler and turned up the right sideline to score. Next, Humphries found Lewis in stride inside the Raider 10 for a 50-yard touchdown. Los Angeles responded by moving into Charger territory for the first time, but Byrd's one-handed interception ended the threat. Lewis's 20-yard reception on 3rd and 12 was the biggest play of the next drive, which ended with another Carney field goal. The Chargers led 23–0 at the break, having scored on all five of their first half possessions while holding the ball for over 20 minutes and outgaining the Raiders 233–30.

The Charger defense continued their dominance into the 3rd quarter, forcing three further three-and-outs while Carney added another field goal. Los Angeles' backup quarterback Vince Evans threw two touchdowns in the latter stages, but San Diego responded each time. Seau's interception set up a short Bieniemy touchdown run, and Derrick Walker's 34-yard reception positioned Carney for a fifth field goal.

Byrd made his 42nd and final interception. All of these were with the Chargers, and remain a club record for a career. Carney's set a club record with five field goals in a single game. Due to a loss by Kansas City earlier in the day, San Diego moved into first place in the AFC West.

Week 17: at Seattle Seahawks 

San Diego avoided a major upset to complete their transformation from 0–4 to 11–5 division champions. Seattle were on their way to a record for the fewest points scored in a 16-game regular season (140), but drove 93 yards in only 7 plays to start the game, with Chris Warren running for gains of 31 and 30 yards, the latter for a touchdown. Walker's 17-yard catch on 3rd on 5 helped position San Diego for a field goal - Carney's 31-yard kick was his 14th success in a row, a club record. In response, the Seahawks were poised for a field goal try of their own, but a botched hold prevented them getting the kick away. Humphries completed a 55-yard pass to Lewis on the next drive, but was sacked by Rufus Porter and Cortez Kennedy soon afterwards, and knocked out of the game with a dislocated shoulder. San Diego settled for another field goal, and trailed 7–6 at halftime.

Week 1 starter Bob Gagliano played the second half at quarterback for the Chargers. He led an 8-play, 80-yard touchdown drive to start the second half, finding Miller for completions of 25, 11 (on 4th and 3), and 19 yards. Butts finished the drive with a 7-yard touchdown, fighting through the attempted tackle of Robert Blackmon. The Seahawks responded with another quick touchdown drive, going 86 yards in 7 plays for a 14–13 lead. With 11 minutes remaining in the game, San Diego were facing a 3rd and 1 from their own 12 yard line. Gagliano completed back-to-back passes of 19 yards to Jefferson and 22 yards to Miller, Butts picked up a further first down and Carney put the Chargers ahead with a 47-yard field goal, with 5:17 to play. San Diego scored three more times in the span of barely four minutes. Plummer intercepted Stan Gelbaugh, returning the ball 38 yards to the Seattle 8. Three plays later, Harmon took a delayed handoff and swept left for a 5-yard touchdown. Gelbaugh was sacked by O'Neal and Grossman on the next drive, the latter in the end zone for Grossman's second safety of the season. The Chargers then went three-and-out, but Gelbaugh was soon intercepted again, Byrd tipping the ball for Carrington to intercept and return 26 yards for the game's final points.

Gagliano was 9 of 15 for 125 yards, in what proved to be the last on-field action of his career. San Diego made the playoffs for the first time since 1982, and won their division for the first time since 1981.

Standings

Postseason

Game summaries

AFC Wildcard Playoffs: Chiefs at Chargers 

Marion Butts broke open a scoreless game with his 54-yard touchdown run midway through the 3rd quarter. Humphries was cleared to start after his injury the previous week - he completed 14 of 23 passes for 199, while being sacked five times; Chiefs' quarterback Dave Krieg was sacked seven times as both defenses were dominant. After Butts opened the scoring, Leslie O'Neal set up a Carney field goal with an interception, and Steve Hendrickson made sure of the victory with a late touchdown. Kansas City didn't get farther than the San Diego 34 yard line all game.

AFC Divisional Playoffs: Chargers at Dolphins 

Humphries was intercepted four times as the Chargers were shut out by Miami. Dan Marino threw three touchdowns in the 2nd quarter, each of those following an interception. San Diego's farthest progress of the game was the Miami 40 yard line.

References 

San Diego Chargers
San Diego Chargers seasons
AFC West championship seasons
San Diego Chargers f